Uroš Korun (born 25 May 1987) is a Slovenian footballer who plays as a defender for Radomlje.

Honours

Piast Gliwice
Ekstraklasa: 2018–19

Olimpija Ljubljana
Slovenian Cup: 2020–21

References

External links
NZS profile 

1987 births
Living people
Sportspeople from Celje
Slovenian footballers
Association football defenders
NK Celje players
NK Zagorje players
NK Rudar Velenje players
NK Domžale players
Piast Gliwice players
NK Olimpija Ljubljana (2005) players
NK Radomlje players
Slovenian PrvaLiga players
Slovenian Second League players
Ekstraklasa players
Slovenia youth international footballers
Slovenia under-21 international footballers
Slovenian expatriate footballers
Slovenian expatriate sportspeople in Poland
Expatriate footballers in Poland